Littlechild may refer to:

 John Littlechild (1848–1923), first commander of the London Metropolitan Police Special Irish Branch
 Patricia Littlechild (born 1965), Scottish sport shooter and neurosurgeon
 Willie Littlechild (born 1944), Cree lawyer and member of parliament